Danielle Campo, (born January 4, 1985) is a Canadian Paralympic swimmer.

Career
Campo first competed for Canada at the 2000 Summer Paralympics in Sydney, where she won gold in the 100 metre freestyle S7 in a world record time of 1:14.64, gold in the 50 metre freestyle S7 in a Paralympic record time of 34.98, silver in the 400 metre freestyle S7 in 5:35.08 and with Jessica Sloan, Andrea Cole and Stéphanie Dixon won gold in the 4×100 metre freestyle 34pts in a world record time of 4:38.01.

At the 2002 Commonwealth Games in Manchester, Campo won bronze in the 50 metre EAD freestyle. Competing against swimmers in other classifications, Campo covered the distance in a Games record time of 35.02, 0.04 seconds over her target time.

At the 2002 IPC World Championships in Mar del Plata, Argentina, Campo won gold in the 50 metre freestyle S7 in 34.77, gold in the 100 metre freestyle S7 in 1:15.88 and silver in the 400 metre freestyle S7 in 5:46.16.

At the 2004 Summer Paralympics in Athens, Campo won bronze in the 50 metre freestyle S7 in 35.17, bronze in the 400 metre freestyle S7 in 5:39.13, finished 4th in the 100 metre freestyle S7 in 1:15.97, finished 11th in the 50 metre butterfly S7 in 48.56 and with Dixon, Cole and Anne Polinario won silver in the 4×100 metre freestyle 34pts in 4:41.70.

Honours
For her sporting success, Campo was awarded the Queen Elizabeth II Golden Jubilee Medal in 1992, the Queen Elizabeth II Diamond Jubilee Medal in 2012 and in 2001 became a member of the Order of Ontario.

References

External links 
 

1985 births
Living people
Canadian amputees
Canadian female butterfly swimmers
Canadian female freestyle swimmers
Paralympic swimmers of Canada
Amputee category Paralympic competitors
Paralympic gold medalists for Canada
Paralympic silver medalists for Canada
Paralympic bronze medalists for Canada
Swimmers at the 2000 Summer Paralympics
Swimmers at the 2004 Summer Paralympics
Medalists at the 2000 Summer Paralympics
Medalists at the 2004 Summer Paralympics
Commonwealth Games medallists in swimming
Commonwealth Games bronze medallists for Canada
Swimmers at the 2002 Commonwealth Games
Members of the Order of Ontario
Place of birth missing (living people)
Medalists at the World Para Swimming Championships
Paralympic medalists in swimming
S7-classified Paralympic swimmers
21st-century Canadian women
Medallists at the 2002 Commonwealth Games